Charkhi Dadri District is one of the 22 districts of Haryana state in north west India near Rajasthan border, but not sharing border with Rajasthan. Created on 1 December 2016, the district headquarters is the city of Charkhi Dadri.

History

British colonial era

During British raj, Charkhi Dadri was a princely state with an area of 575sq miles and revenue of Rs 103,000 annually. In Indian Rebellion of 1857, the Nawab of Dadri, Bahadur Jung Khan who had given token allegiance to mughal emperor Bahadur Shah Zafar, surrendered to British and tried by military court martial in Delhi on 27 November 1857. He was removed to Lahore. Dadri was awarded to Raja Swarup Singh of Jind State of the Phulkian dynasty for his services to British East India Company in the 1857 war.

In May 1874, fifty villages revolted against his descendant Raja Raghubir Singh Jind but the rebellion was crushed with force. Three principal villages which took part in the rebellion, Charkhi, Mankawas and Jhojhu, were burned down as a result.

Formation of district
Previously in Bhiwani district, Charkhi Dadri became part of the new Charkhi Dadri district in 2016. The Government of Haryana state officially notified Charkhi Dadri as 22nd district of Haryana on 16 November 2016. It was established on 1 December 2016.

Administrative divisions 
As of December 2018, it has 2 sub-divisions (Charkhi Dadri and Badhra), 2 tehsils (Charkhi Dadri and Badhra) and one sub-tehsil (Baund Kalan).

Demographics 

As of the 2011 census, the district had a population of 502,276 of which 265,949 were male and 236,327 were female. 11.22% of the population lived in urban areas. Scheduled Castes were 89,426 (17.80%) of the district's population.

Languages 

At the time of the 2011 census, 90.03% of the population spoke Haryanvi and 8.72% Hindi as their first language.

Notable individuals 
 Chandrawati, first woman MP from Haryana
 Phogat sisters: Geeta Phogat, Babita Kumari, Priyanka Phogat, Ritu Phogat, Vinesh Phogat and Sangita Phogat, all trained by Mahavir Singh Phogat (father)

 Hukam Singh, former Chief Minister of Haryana

 Lt. KIRAN SHEORAN  
 Lieutenant KIRAN SHEORAN has created an History for being The 1st INDIAN ARMY FEMALE COMMISSIONED OFFICER of Ch.Dadri District.  Grand daughter of Ch. DhariRam Sheoran from Village Dhanasri, got Commissioned in 2017. Her Father, Sgt.Shamsher Singh Sheoran has served into the Indian Air Force.

 Hawa Singh, boxer and honorary captain in the Indian Army.

 Sh. Ram Krishan Gupta, Freedom Fighter, ex-MP. and a philanthropist. He also joined the Azad Hind Fouj and was a close associate of Netaji Subhash Chander Boss. Guptaji was elected to Lok Sabha twice, first in 1955 and then in 1967. He set up "Dadri Education Society" in 1961 with the determination of enlightening the lives of this economically, socially and educationally backward area. He set up eight Institutions including JVMGRR College to promote education.

See also 
 Bhiwani district
 Changrod
 List of districts of Haryana

References

Links
https://charkhidadri.gov.in/district-profile/
 Official website
Tribune India, accessed 8 Jan 2017
Times of India, accessed 8 Jan 2017
Times of India, accessed 8 Jan 2017

 
Districts of Haryana
2016 establishments in Haryana